The Third Itō Cabinet is the seventh Cabinet of Japan led by Itō Hirobumi from January 12, 1898, to June 30, 1898.

Cabinet

References 

Cabinet of Japan
1898 establishments in Japan